I is the debut studio album by English metal band Xerath. It was released on 25 May 2009 through Candlelight Records.  It was mixed and mastered by Brett-Caldas Lima at Tower Studios.  The iconic artwork was by Colin Marks of Rainsong Design.

The video for "False History" received heavy rotation in the UK on rock music channel Scuzz.

Critical response
Kerrang! - "Sure to blow all the competition out of the water"
Terrorizer - "Possibly one of the most exciting things to come out of the British metal scene for some time"
Powerplay - "Head nodding grooves and filmic drama"
Metal Hammer UK "Xerath sound like the result of a chaotic experiment to produce the ultimate please-them-all 21st century metal band.

Track listing

References

External links
Xerath Myspace page
Xerath Official website
Tower Studio's official site
Candlelight Records
Xerath last fm page
Rain Song Design

2009 albums
Candlelight Records albums
Xerath albums